Jonathan Alan "Jonty" Smith (born 19 February 1992) is a South African competitive rower.

He competed at the 2016 Summer Olympics in Rio de Janeiro, in the men's coxless four. The South African team finished in 4th place.

References

1992 births
Living people
South African male rowers
Olympic rowers of South Africa
Rowers at the 2016 Summer Olympics
21st-century South African people